Fanfins or hairy anglerfish are a family, Caulophrynidae, of anglerfishes. They are found in deep, lightless waters of the Atlantic, Indian, and Pacific Oceans.

They are distinguished from other anglerfishes by the lack of the expanded escal bulb — the bioluminescent lure at the end of the illicium — and by their very long dorsal and anal fin rays.

As in other anglerfishes, males are one-tenth the size of females and, after larval and adolescent free-living stages, spend the rest of their lives parasitically attached to a female. The fanfin has a small, spherical body with long protuberances.

References 

Caulophrynidae
Deep sea fish